Georges Vanier Secondary School (also named as Georges Vanier SS, GVSS, Georges Vanier or Vanier) and Woodbine Middle School (shortly called as Woodbine M.S., WMS and Woodbine) are two public schools consisting of a junior high school (Grades 6 to 8) and high school (Grades 9 to 12) located in North York district of Toronto, Ontario. Owned and Operated by the North York Board of Education (which is now merged into the Toronto District School Board), the school was named after Canada's first French-Canadian Governor General, Georges Vanier. Attached to the Vanier-Woodbine campus is the North-East Year Round Alternative Centre.

History
Opened in 1966, Georges Vanier was selected by the Canadian Education Association as one of 21 exemplary schools across Canada. The school offers specialized  programs such as MSC2, Stem +, Program 2 Art, "One World Youth Arts Project" program, BSc@Van, and the "Focus on Information Technology (FIT)" program, in addition to offering an Advanced Placement program and a Centennial College Partnership program. The school also provides 3 Specialist High Skills Majors (SHSM) programs: Advance, ICT, and Aviation & Aerospace. These programs give students the opportunity to earn nationally recognized certifications.

Incidents
On the night of November 3rd, 2003 a fatal gang brawl left one individual dead after he succumbed to stab wounds. The individual was not a student at the school and later identified as a resident of Richmond Hill, Ontario who happened to be in the area at the time of the fight.

Notable alumni
Ravi Baichwal, Chicago-based news anchor for ABC News, former national reporter and anchor for CTV News.
Kirk McLean, the goaltender for the Vancouver Canucks that lead them to the 1994 Stanley Cup Finals.
Mark McKoy, Track & Field Olympian
Benny Hinn, TV evangelist and faith healer.
Geddy Lee, lead singer and bassist of the rock band Rush
Alex Lifeson, guitarist of the rock band Rush
Ian Crichton, guitarist of the rock band Saga
Maurice LaMarche, two-time Emmy-winning voice actor for Futurama, also Emmy-nominated in 1998 for his voice acting work as "The Brain" in Pinky and the Brain.
Howie Mandel, comedian and Deal Or No Deal host, attended for half a year, and Vanier is the unnamed high school he references as the one to which he called in contractors for an estimate for an unauthorized addition to the east wing. He was expelled for the prank.
Thomas Cully, 2-Time Telly Award Winning Producer, also the writer and Producer for the upcoming Psychological Horror Shallow Descent Executive Producer Devil Seed Senior Producer Designing Spaces Senior Producer The Balancing Act Senior Producer Inside the Blueprint Senior Producer Designing Spaces Luxury Edition''
Garth Richardson, Grammy-nominated engineer, Juno-nominated and Juno-winning music producer
Alannah Myles, recording artist and songwriter best known for the 1989 hit single, "Black Velvet"
David Bendeth, award-winning music producer, writer, mixing engineer and recording artist
Gord Stellick, Media personality and former manager of the Toronto Maple Leafs hockey club
Norman Findlay, Toronto lawyer and corporate director
Leighton Hope, Canadian sprinter and Olympian
Brian Saunders, Canadian sprinter and Olympian
Rob Salem, long-time entertainment columnist with the Toronto Star; host on the Drive-In Classics movie channel

References

External links
 Georges Vanier Secondary School
 Woodbine Junior High School
 TDSB Profile (Vanier)
 TDSB Profile (Woodbine)
 TDSB Profile (NEYRAC)

High schools in Toronto
North York
Schools in the TDSB
Educational institutions established in 1968
1968 establishments in Ontario
School buildings completed in 1968